The Mate Parlov Sport Centre is a multi-purpose indoor sports arena located in Pula, Croatia. It is the home venue of the RK Arena handball team. Currently the arena has a capacity of 2,312 seats.

External links 
2009 World Championship arena site

Indoor arenas in Croatia
Handball venues in Croatia
Sports venues completed in 1978
Buildings and structures in Pula
Sport in Pula
1978 establishments in Yugoslavia